Surdulica is a town and municipality located in the Pčinja District of southern Serbia. As of 2011, the population of the town is 11,400, while the municipality has 20,319 inhabitants.

History
Historically, the town by its modern name was first mentioned in texts from 1530 by Benedict Kuripešić. Following the revolutions of Serbia and the last Turks out of the town in 1877, it soon started to grow and develop in the hands of the independent nation of Serbia. Today, it is an industrial town with beautiful nature and plenty of wildlife.

Massacre during World War I

During World War I, 2,000–3,000 men were massacred by Bulgarian forces in the town from 1916 to 1917.

Yugoslavia (1918–92)
From 1929 to 1941, Surdulica was part of the Vardar Banovina of the Kingdom of Yugoslavia. After World War II, Surdulica gradually industrialized, with one of the largest employers in the town being Zastava Pes, a supplier to Zastava's automotive wing. With the introduction of sanctions against Yugoslavia during the 1990s, Zastava Pes reduced its workforce by 70% and had its international contracts terminated.

1999 NATO bombings

Over the course of the 1999 NATO bombing of Yugoslavia, Surdulica was subject to NATO bombings on multiple occasions. By the end of the bombing campaign, approximately fifty homes were destroyed and around 600 more were damaged in Surdulica alone. On April 27, 1999, NATO missiles struck several houses in the southern town of Surdulica. A CNN journalist named Alessio Vinci subsequently visited the local morgue, where he reported 16 civilians killed as a result of the attack. One of Serbia's public broadcasters, RTS, reported that 20 civilians were killed during the April 27 bombings, whereas Human Rights Watch only recorded eleven deaths. Many of the victims had been killed in a single house on Zmaj Jova street, owned by Vojislav Milić. Milić's family and several neighbors took refuge in Milić's basement when his house was struck by two bombs, after which nine people were killed in his house alone.

Over the night of May 30–31, 1999, NATO airstrikes destroyed a sanatorium and a retirement home in Surdulica. Human Rights Watch published the names of the 23 civilians killed in the sanatorium.

Geography
The town stands at 480 m above sea level; it is surrounded by mountains to the north by Čemernik and to the south by Vardenik; the highest peak Strešer stands at 1875 meters high. Some twenty kilometres along the river Vrla and up the mountains there is a highland called Vlasina. In the 1950s, a man made dam created a lake called Vlasinsko Jezero (Vlasina Lake) which is famous for its peat floating islands which were harvested by local farmers. The highland of Vlasina is unique natural reserve with rich wildlife in particular the many rare species of migrating birds that use this unique place as a stop on their migrating way north or south. The lake is rich with fish and is one of largest reservoirs of clean water in that part of the country. The surrounding soil is lush and green resembling the Devon Downs or Argentine pampas. It presents great potential for cattle breeding and dairy production. It has distinct four seasons with long snowy winters and brief hot summers. 
There are also two streams running from the mountains and joining at the town of Surdulica. This is where the Romanovce River joins the Vrla River on their way to South Morava and thence to the Danube and the Black Sea.

Settlements
 
Aside from the town of Surdulica, the municipality includes the following settlements:

Alakince
Bacijevce
Belo Polje
Binovce
Bitvrđa
Božica
Vlasina Okruglica
Vlasina Rid
Vlasina Stojkovićeva
Vučadelce
Gornja Koznica
Gornje Romanovce
Groznatovci
Danjino Selo
Dikava
Donje Romanovce
Drajinci
Dugi Del
Dugojnica
Zagužanje
Jelašnica
Kalabovce
Kijevac
Klisura
Kolunica
Kostroševci
Leskova Bara
Masurica
Mačkatica
Novo Selo
Palja
Rđavica
Stajkovce
Strezimirovci
Suvojnica
Suhi Dol
Topli Do
Topli Dol
Troskač
Ćurkovica

Demographics

According to the 2011 census results, the municipality of Surdulica has a population of 20,319 inhabitants.

Ethnic groups
The ethnic composition of the municipality of Surdulica:

Economy
The following table gives a preview of total number of registered people employed in legal entities per their core activity (as of 2018):

Education
There are two primary schools in the town of Surdulica - Vuk Karadžić and Jovan Jovanović Zmaj, and several schools in the villages around the town. There are three secondary schools: Svetozar Marković Gimnazija (Grammar School), Josif Pančić School of Agriculture and a technical college, Nikola Tesla. In line with falling population in the municipality of Surdulica the number of high school students is also falling.

See also
 List of places in Serbia

Notes and references
Notes
 Zmaj Jova street is named after Jovan Jovanović Zmaj. Serbian variations of nouns are such that the street is spelled as "Zmaj Jove" (as opposed to having an "a" letter at the end) in the context of the sentence in the OK Radio article on the Milić family from Surdulica.

References

Sources

External links

 

Populated places in Pčinja District
Municipalities and cities of Southern and Eastern Serbia